Conasprella joanae is a species of sea snail, a marine gastropod mollusc in the family Conidae, the cone snails, cone shells or cones.

Distribution
This marine species occurs in the Atlantic Ocean off Rio Grande do Norte, Brazil

References

 Petuch E.J. & Berschauer D.P. (2018). Ten new cone shells from Indonesia, the Marquesas Islands, Brazil, and Pacific Panama. The Festivus. 50(1): 17-35. page(s): 23, figs 4, 12E-F

joanae
Gastropods described in 2018